North Central Kansas Technical College (NCK Tech) is a public technical school in Beloit, Kansas, United States. From its establishment in 1964 to the time the Kansas Board of Regents took over the college, the name of the school was North Central Kansas Area Vocational-Technical School.

Governance
The Kansas Board of Regents governs six universities and coordinates and supervises Kansas’ 19 community colleges, five technical colleges, and five technical schools. Institutions that wish to deliver approved programs or courses within the service area governed by the North Central Kansas Technical College Board of Trustees.

References

External links
 

Public universities and colleges in Kansas
Technological universities in the United States
Education in Lyon County, Kansas
Emporia, Kansas
Buildings and structures in Mitchell County, Kansas
Two-year colleges in the United States
Educational institutions established in 1964
1964 establishments in Kansas